In the United Kingdom,  Ireland, and parts of the Commonwealth, consultant is the title of a senior hospital-based physician or surgeon who has completed all of their specialist training and been placed on the specialist register in their chosen speciality. Their role is entirely distinct from that of general practitioners, or GPs.

The primary objective of a consultant is to use expert knowledge and skill to diagnose and treat patients while retaining ultimate clinical responsibility for their care. A physician must be on the Specialist Register before they may be employed as a substantive consultant in the National Health Service (NHS). This usually entails holding a Certificate of Completion of Training (CCT) in any of the recognised specialities, but academics with substantial publications and international reputation may be exempted from this requirement, in the expectation that they will practice at a tertiary level. "Locum consultant" appointments of limited duration may be given to those with clinical experience, with or without higher qualifications.

In South East Asian countries, practitioners who have at least post graduation degree like Doctor of Medicine and more than 10 years of clinical experience in treating patients are labelled as consultant.

Definition

CCSC/BMA 
The Central Consultants and Specialists Committee (CCSC), which is a Standing Committee of the BMA, agreed the following as a very broad description of the role of consultants:

"Primarily as the delivery of expert clinical care usually within a team, including the ability to recognise and manage the more complex end of the specialty spectrum (diagnosis, management decisions, difficult cases, including apparently simple cases which have a high incidence of complications in more inexperienced hands) but also involved in running departments, managerial decisions, teaching, training, researching, developing local services – generally being involved in the wider management and leadership of the organisations they work in, and the NHS generally."

This report from 2008 describes how most consultants work now and it describes what the 2003 contract was intended (by BMA negotiators at least) to remunerate and develop (a consultant-based service).

Cohn 
Cohn mentions that "the consultant should try to support the referring physician and comfort the patient."

Responsibilities 
A consultant typically leads a "firm" (team of doctors) which comprises Specialty Registrars and Foundation Doctors, all training to work in the consultant's speciality, as well as other "career grade" doctors such as clinical assistants, clinical fellows, Speciality Doctors, Associate Specialists and staff grade doctors. They also have numerous other key roles in the functioning of hospitals and the wider health service.

Challenges

Consultation time vs. quality 
In terms of patient care, consultation times are controversial ground, with quality of communication is key over quantity of time spent with the client.

Multi-role skills 
Sindermann and Sawyer conclude in their book The Scientist as Consultant, that a [scientific] consultant is successful if they have "achieved a viable mix of technical proficiency and business skills" with "technical proficiency" meaning excellence in competence, credibility, effective networking with colleagues, and ability to negotiate.

Domain-challenges 
Domain-specific challenges for consultants exist. In palliative medicine consulting, emotions, beliefs, sensitive topics, difficulty communicating and prognosis interpretation, or patients expectations despite critical illness are some of the challenges faced by the consultant.

Training
The time required to become a consultant depends upon a number of factors, but principally the speciality chosen. Certain specialities require longer training, or are more competitive, and therefore becoming a consultant can take longer. Other specialities are relatively easy to progress through, and it is possible for a doctor to become a consultant much earlier in their career. After Modernising Medical Careers came into operation (in early 2007), the length of training was fixed for the majority of doctors, at about nine years.

Contracts
Most consultants work on a long-term contract with one or more hospital trusts, and these posts are known as substantive consultant positions. Various titles (such as senior consultant, clinical director, medical director, lead consultant etc.) exist for consultants who have particular responsibilities for the overall management of the hospital or some part thereof.

In the UK all doctors including consultants have the right to undertake private medical work. Some make a career out of private medical practice. For others it is used to supplement their work for the NHS.

Other doctors - some without a CCT, a few who have only just obtained that qualification, others who have retired from substantive appointments, and others who wish to use some of their annual leave to generate additional earnings - may be employed as locum consultants, who have the same clinical responsibility, but are typically on fixed, short-term contracts.

 Pay scale (2022 contract) 
Consultants in the NHS start £88,364 (Threshold 1) to £119,133 (Threshold 8) with additional "Clinical excellence awards" available.

Further reading 

 Oxtoby, Kathy. “Professional Roles Are Blurring.” BMJ (Clinical research ed.) (2009): a3163. Print.

See also
 Attending physician (the equivalent position in the United States and Canada, obtained after completion of the medical residency and, if pursued, the medical fellowship)
 Junior doctor
 Specialist registrar

References

Consulting occupations
Healthcare occupations in the United Kingdom